Prochola is a moth of the family Agonoxenidae.

Species
 Prochola aedilis
 Prochola agypsota
 Prochola basichlora
 Prochola catacentra
 Prochola catholica
 Prochola chalcothorax
 Prochola chloropis
 Prochola euclina
 Prochola fuscula
 Prochola holomorpha
 Prochola obstructa
 Prochola ochromicta
 Prochola oppidana
 Prochola orphnopa
 Prochola orthobasis
 Prochola pervallata
 Prochola prasophanes
 Prochola revecta
 Prochola sancticola
 Prochola semialbata
 Prochola sollers
 Prochola subtincta

References

Agonoxeninae
Moth genera